Prabhu means master or the Prince in Sanskrit and many of the Indian languages; it is a name sometimes applied to God. The term is also used by devotees of the Hindu God Lord Krishna/Vishnu as a title and form of address. It is also appended after a devotee's name, for example "Madhava Prabhu". In Indonesia, especially in Balinese, Javanese, and Sundanese culture, the term "Prabu" is used as a part of royal titles, especially to address Kings such as Prabhu Siliwangi, Prabu Kiansantang (the son of Prabu Siliwangi), etc.

As a surname 

A common surname among people across the Konkan Coast in India, from Karnataka, Maharashtra to Goa and.

As a title
"Prabhu" is a Sanskrit word, it is predominantly used to refer to a supreme being or god. Certain Indian languages associate the word for someone they have devotion for especially for Hindu gods like Lord Krishna and Rama. According to historian Anant Ramkrishna Sinai Dhume, Prabhu was a title accorded to the representative of the main village of the taluka (district) committee. The Prabhus may have also occupied official posts in the central administration, without prejudice to their original posts which were hereditary. Traditionally, a Prabhu was a  village chief, Ministers, Zamindars, administrators, landlord and as such a master to the many agricultural labourers that were needed to cultivate his lands. "Prabhu" as a title is mainly found among Saraswat Brahmins, Karhade Brahmins and Prabhu communities in Maharashtra and Goa. In Indonesia, rajas (kings) are given the title "Prabhu", such as Prabhu Siliwangi king of the Sunda Kingdom, Prabu Kiansantang (son of Prabhu Siliwangi), Prabhu Bratasenna king of Java who ruled in the 8th century, and other numerous kings.

Notable people
 Prabhu Dasamuka, Indonesian (Javanese and Balinese) name addressed for Ravana which means "The king with ten heads"

First name
 Prabhu (actor) (born 1956), Indian actor
 Prabhu B. Patil, Indian bacterial geneticist
 Prabhu Chauhan (born 1969)
 Prabhu Chawla (born 1946), Indian journalist 
 Prabhu Dayal Balmiki (born 1963), Indian politician
 Prabhu Dayal Himatsingka (1889–1991), Indian politicianCongress
 Prabhu Dayal Katheria (born 1952), Indian politician and agriculturist
 Prabhu Dayal Nigam, Indian interventional cardiologist
 Prabhu Deva, Indian dance choreographer, film director, producer, and actor
 Prabhu Goel (born 1951), an Indian American researcher, entrepreneur and businessman
 Prabhu Jagadbandhu (1871–1921), Hindu Saint of Bengal
 Prabhu Lal Bhatnagar (1912–1976), Indian mathematician
 Prabhu Lal Saini (born 1954), Rajasthani politician
 Prabhu Mundkur (born 1988), Indian model and actor
 Prabhu Narayan Singh (1855–1931), ruler of the Indian Princely State of Benares State from 1889 to 1931
 Prabhu Siliwangi, the king of the Hindu Sunda kingdom of Indonesia from 1482 to 1521
 Prabhu Solomon (born 1969), Indian film director

Surname
 Karkala Pulkeri Janardhan Prabhu(born 1911), Ex- Chairman Canara Bank,Indian Banker & Economist 
 Bolanthur Krishna Prabhu (1882–?), wrote Chandrahas Natak
 Gayathri Prabhu (born 1974), Indian novelist
 Ghanasyam Prabhu, an Indian cricket umpire
 H. Boniface Prabhu (born 1972), Indian q­riplegic wheelchair tennis player
  (born 1954), Indian sprinter
 Jaideep Prabhu (born 1967), professor
 K. N. Prabhu (1923–2006)
 Lakshman Prabhu, a minister in the court of the Silhara dynasty
 Leo Prabhu (born 1933), veteran dramatist, playwright, and novelist
 M. S. Prabhu, on IMDb
 Mamta Prabhu (born 1983), table tennis player
 Manik Prabhu (1817–1865), Hindu saint, philosopher, poet, mystic, and guru
 Manjiri Prabhu (born 1964), Indian author, TV producer and filmmaker
 Manohar Prabhu Parrikar (1955–2019), Indian politician
 Maya Prabhu, medical doctor
 Megha Prabhu, co-founder and CFO Yes Bank
 N. U. Prabhu (1924–2022), Indian-American mathematician
 Neeraj Prabhu (born 1976), Indian-born former English cricketer
 Neeshan Prabhoo, chutney musician
 Peter Paul Prabhu (1931–2013)
 R. Prabhu (born 1947), Indian National Congress member of Parliament in India
 R.S. Prabhu (born 1950), Indian film producer and film director
 Rakesh Prabhu, Indian cricketer
 S. R. Prabhu, Indian film producer
 Satyajit Prabhu, music arranger, composer, and multi-instrumentalist
 Seetharam Prabhu (born 1964), Indian cricket umpire
 Shashi Prabhu (born 1944), Indian architect
 Srinivas Prabhu, actor
 Sunil Prabhu (born 1969), Indian politician
 Suresh Prabhu (born 1953), Indian politician
 Vasant K. Prabhu, professor
 Vasant Prabhu (died 1968)
 Vasundhara Prabhu, director of education at the Farnsworth Art Museum
 Venkat Prabhu (born 1975), Indian filmmaker, actor, director, and playback singer
 Vikram Prabhu, Indian actor

See also
 Prabhu Communities, a group of distinct Hindu castes found in Maharashtra, India
 Chaitanya Mahaprabhu (1486–1533)
 A. C. Bhaktivedanta Swami Prabhupada (1896–1977), Indian spiritual teacher
 Rani, the Sanskrit word for "princess"
 Prabhu (film), a 1979 Indian Malayalam-language film
 Hey Prabhu!, a 2019 Indian web TV show

References

Surnames
Indian surnames
Konkani-language surnames